Greater St. Louis has a Chinese community. There are 1,931 Chinese Americans in St. Louis (0.6% of the city's population), and 14,460 living in the Greater St. Louis area (0.5% of the area's population).

The first Chinese immigrant to St. Louis was Alla Lee, a 24-year-old from Ningbo who arrived in 1857. He socialized with the Irish American community and married an Irish woman. He sold coffee and tea in a shop on North Tenth Street.

Around 1867, several hundred Chinese looking for work in factories and mines in and around St. Louis moved there from New York and San Francisco. The community they settled, Hop Alley, became St. Louis' Chinatown.

This community disappeared in 1966 when it was demolished to make room for a parking lot for Busch Stadium. Many Chinese Americans moved to St. Louis's Missouri suburbs, where they founded Chinese-language schools and Chinese churches and community organizations.

Demographics
In the late 19th century and the early 20th century, the ethnic Chinese population was less than 0.1% of the city's population. There were 300 Chinese in St. Louis by the end of the 19th century. In 1960, 102 Chinese lived in the St. Louis suburbs, making up 30% of the Greater St. Louis Chinese. In 1970, 461 lived in the suburbs, making up 80% of the area population. In 1980 the number increased to 3,873, making up 78% of the area population. In 1990, the number increased to 3,873, making up 83% of the area total.

The 2000 U.S. Census said that there were 9,120 people of Chinese descent in Greater St. Louis. Huping Ling, author of Chinese St. Louis: From Enclave to Cultural Community, said that unofficial estimates as of 2004 ranged from 15,000 to 20,000. She said that 1% of the population of suburban St. Louis was ethnic Chinese and that the "great majority" of the ethnic Chinese in the area lived in the suburbs, particularly those west and south of St. Louis.

Economy
As of 2004, the St. Louis area had more than 300 Chinese restaurants.

During the late 19th and early 20th centuries, St. Louis' Chinese population provided 60% of the city's laundry services.

Institutions
As of 2004, there were more than 40 Chinese community organizations in the area. Organization of Chinese Americans has an area chapter, OCA St. Louis, founded in 1973. Other organizations include the St. Louis Overseas Chinese Educational Activity Center aka the Chinese Cultural Center , the St. Louis Taiwanese Association, the Chinese Liberty Assembly, and the St. Louis Chinese Jaycees.

Education

As of 2016, there were four Chinese-language schools in the St. Louis area: 
 St. Louis Modern Chinese School in Richmond Heights was established in 1997 by the Mainland China-origin community with 40 students. By 2007, there were several hundred students. 
 St. Louis Chinese Language School ( holds its classes at the St. Joseph Institute for the Deaf school in Chesterfield.
 St. Louis Chinese Academy holds its classes at the St. Louis Community College at Meramec Campus in Kirkwood. 
 St. Louis Language Immersion School operates a Chinese School at 3740 Marine Avenue in the city of St. Louis. Education at the school is free for area students.   
As well, St. Louis University High School has Chinese-language programs and is home to a Confucius classroom that is part of Webster University's Confucius Institute.

Media
As of 2004, there were two weekly Chinese language newspapers: 
 St. Louis Chinese American News , headquartered in Overland, 
 St. Louis Chinese Journal , headquartered in University City.

Religion
As of 2004 there are around 12 Chinese religious institutions.

Christian churches include the Taiwanese Presbyterian Church of Greater St. Louis (TPCSTL,  in Ballwin, the St. Louis Chinese Christian Church (SLCCC; in Chesterfield, the St. Louis Chinese Gospel Church  in Manchester, the Light of Christ Lutheran Chinese Mission  in Olivette, The St. Louis Chinese Baptist Church (STLCBC;  in St. Peters, the Lutheran Asian Ministry in St. Louis, and the St. Louis Tabernacle of Joy.

The other religious institutions are the St. Louis Amitabha Buddhist Learning Center, the St. Louis Tzu-Chi Foundation, the St. Louis International Buddhist Association, the Mid-America Buddhist Association (MABA) in Augusta, and the St. Louis Falun Dafa. The Fo Guang Shan St. Louis Buddhist Center (FGS;  is in Bridgeton.

Recreation
The Chinese Culture Days are annually held at the Missouri Botanical Gardens. The Chinese community organizations sponsor this event, cultural gatherings, and other Chinese-American events.

Notable residents
 Steven Chu, physicist 
 Huping Ling, professor at Washington University in St. Louis
 Qiu Xiaolong, novelist

Notes

References
 Ling, Huping. Chinese St. Louis: From Enclave to Cultural Community. Temple University Press. 2004. , 9781439905814.
 Ling, Huping. Chinese in St. Louis: 1857-2007. Arcadia Publishing, June 20, 2007. , 9781439618967.
 Ling, Huping. "Cultural Community: A New Model for Asian American Community" (Chapter 6). In: Ling, Huping. Asian America: Forming New Communities, Expanding Boundaries. Rutgers University Press, April 29, 2009. , 9780813548678.
 Ling, Huping. "Growing Up in "Hop Alley": Chinese American Youth in St. Louis During the Early Twentieth Century" (Chapter 3). In: Tong, Benson. Asian American Children: A Historical Handbook and Guide (Children and Youth: History and Culture Series, ISSN 1546-6752). Greenwood Publishing Group, January 1, 2004. Start p. 65. , 9780313330421.

Reference notes

Further reading
 Ling, Huping. "Reconceptualizing Chinese American Community in St. Louis: from Chinatown to Cultural Community." Journal of American Ethnic History. University of Illinois Press. Vol. 24, No. 2 (Winter, 2005), pp. 65–101
 Cheng, Hong. "Chinese St. Louis: From Enclave to Cultural Community" (review). Journal of Chinese Overseas. Volume 2, Number 2, November 2006. p. 320-323 | 10.1353/jco.2006.0014
 Au, Tai Yeow. "Chinatown : place and memory : a case study of St. Louis' Chinatown" (Thesis) Washington University, 1991.

External links
 St. Louis Chinese Association (S: 圣路易中国人协会, T: 聖路易中國人協會, P: Shènglùyì Zhōngguórén Xiéhuì)
 Saint Louis Chinese Culture Center
 St. Louis Language Immersion School
 OCA St. Louis
 St. Louis Chinese Language School
 St. Louis Chinese Academy
 St. Louis Chinese American News
 St. Louis Chinese Journal
 Chinese-American History in St. Louis - Washington University Libraries
 "Chinese St. Louis." (Archive) Temple University Press.
 Bebermeyer, Carrie. "SLU Med Students Care for Chinese Community in St. Louis" (Archive). Saint Louis University. May 13, 2013.

Asian-American culture in Missouri
Ethnic groups in St. Louis
History of St. Louis
St. Louis